War Music is the street album by American rapper Slim the Mobster, hosted by DJ Whoo Kid. The album is Slim's debut on Aftermath Entertainment with Gang Module, and is due out for release on November 9, 2011. It was originally due out on the 25 October, but was delayed until the 8th of November. On 7 November, Slim confirmed it had been pushed back an extra day so that Dr. Dre could finish mastering the song he featured on. Confirmed features include Dr. Dre, Eminem, Snoop Dogg, Kendrick Lamar, 50 Cent, Mobb Deep, Nikki Grier and Sly. With production coming from Sid Roams, Jake One, Dr. Dre, Sha Money XL, Nottz, Siege Monstrosity, DJ Silk and Boi-1da among others.

Slim released the singles and accompanying videos to Gun Play and Work For It (Price On Ya Head) onto his official YouTube channel on the 6 September and 20 September. Followed by the upload of Doom Freestyle. He later released What Goes Up onto his official Facebook page on October 5. DJ Whoo Kid previewed the Dr. Dre featured track Back Against The Wall on Shade45 Radio on 6 November.

Track listing

Original production
 "Dreaming" takes its instrumental from "50's My Favorite" as performed by 50 Cent.
 "Back Against the Wall" contains a sample from "Salute" as performed by T.I.
 "Whose House?" contains a sample from "My House" as performed by Big Sean.

Personnel 
 Executive producers: Sha Money XL
 A&R: Brandon "Villa Nova" Lamela
 Marketing: Cashmere Agency
 Photo: Travis Shinn
 Styling: Kieu Couture
 Video & Art Design: Efrain "Eif" Rivera for ERG Designs
 Hosted by DJ Whoo Kid
 Recorded by Charlie Red
 Mixed by Pat Viala
 Mastered by Mark B. Christensen

References

2011 mixtape albums
Albums produced by Dr. Dre
Albums produced by Bink (record producer)
Albums produced by Boi-1da
Albums produced by Jake One
Slim the Mobster albums
Aftermath Entertainment albums